KWRK (96.1 MHz) is an FM radio station with a city of license of Window Rock, Arizona, United States. The station is owned by The Navajo Nation.  It airs a country music format.

The station was assigned the KWRK call letters by the Federal Communications Commission on February 1, 1991.

References

External links
 
 

WRK
Mass media in Apache County, Arizona
Native American radio
Navajo mass media
Radio stations established in 1991
1991 establishments in Arizona